The Cardiff Mela (also known as the Cardiff Multicultural Mela) is an annual large-scale outdoor multicultural festival, held in the city's Roald Dahl Plass, in Cardiff Bay. It is a free event and run by a not for profit organisation based in Cardiff. It celebrates many cultural aspects of Asian life, particularly music, dance, fashion and food. The annual event first took place on an outdoor location in 2007 at Coopers Field, Cardiff Castle in the heart of Cardiff City Centre. The 2009 festival featured  bhangra, Bollywood and rnb singers including H Dhami, Mumzy Stranger and Navin Kundra amongst others. The 2010 event attracted over 30,000 visitors and featured a performance from Bombay Rockers.

The Cardiff Mela is also part of Cardiff Festivals which is a series of events that include live music, street theatre, open-air theatre, children’s entertainment and funfairs. Cardiff Festival provides a mix of popular, well-established and new events that take place in the city centre and around Cardiff Bay.

The Mela was founded by Imran Iqbal who is currently the event's artistic director and coordinator.

2010 Event

In 2010, the Mela was part of a special national partnership entitled 'Planes, Trains and Rickshaws' which saw the two performers start their day in Cardiff Bay, followed by a trip down the M4 to the London Mela, then flying north to end their journey on the Edinburgh Mela stage, performing at all three events in the same day. The event itself was headlined by the Bombay Rockers and Imran Khan, however Imran Khan was unable to perform due to ill health.

2011 Event

The 2011 event took place on Sunday 24 July 2011 and featured performances from Stereo Nation, Mumzy Stranger, Jernade Miah, Mohammed Uzzal miah Panjabi by Nature, Panjabi Hit Squad, Junai Kaden, Juz D. The event was hosted by Tommy Sandhu and Noreen Khan from the BBC Asian Network.

2012 Event

The 2012 event took place on Sunday 15 July 2012. Artists who performed at the event included Imran Khan (singer), H Dhami, Jassi Sidhu & Apache Indian.

2013 Event

The 2013 event will take place on Sunday 30 June 2013. Artists who performed at the event included Juggy D & Jaz Dhami.

2014 Event

The 2014 event took place on Sunday 14 September 2014. Artists who performed at the event included Lehmber Hussainpuri & Team PBN.

2015 - 2018 Event

The event did not go ahead these years due to non availability of funding and non availability of venue.

2019 Event

The 2019 event took place on Sunday 15 September 2019. Headline artists included H Dhami, Koomz, Bambi Bains & Jay Kadn.

2020 - 21 Event

The 2020 and 2021 event was cancelled due to Covid 19.

2022 Event

The 2022 will take place on Sunday 18 September 2022. Headline artists include Raf Saperra, Liilz, Metz & Trix, Dj Kizzi & Panjabi Hit Squad and hosted by Serena, & Smash Bengali from the BBC Asian Network.

References

External links
Cardiff Mela Official Website

Festivals in Cardiff
Butetown